Gold & Platinum is a 2-disc best of/hits compilation by Lynyrd Skynyrd. It was released in 1979. The compilation spans their peak years from 1972–1977.

The album contains three live tracks from the band's critically acclaimed One More from the Road: "Gimme Three Steps", "I Ain't the One", and "Free Bird".

An Alternate version of the album, with different artwork and the title The Very Best of, substituted the original 1973 studio recording (from (Pronounced 'Lĕh-'nérd 'Skin-'nérd)) of "Free Bird" (timed at 9:08) for the much longer live track (timed at 14:10).

The album was certified Gold on March 25, 1980, Platinum on August 18, 1980, and 3× Platinum on July 21, 1987, by the RIAA.

Track listing

Personnel
Ronnie Van Zant - vocals
Gary Rossington - guitars
Allen Collins - guitars
Ed King - guitars, bass (13, 15) 
Steve Gaines - guitars, vocals (4)
Jimmy Johnson - guitar (1) 
Wayne Perkins - guitar (1)
Leon Wilkeson - bass, background vocals (2)
Greg Walker - bass (16)
Bob Burns - drums
Artimus Pyle - drums
Robert Nix - drums (15)
Rickey Medlocke - drums (16), back-up vocals (16)
Billy Powell - keyboards, piano (16)
David Foster - keyboards (12)
Al Kooper aka "Roosevelt Gook" - moog synthesizer (2), background vocal (12), organ (13), mellotron (15), back-up harmony (15)
Ronnie Eades - saxophone (1)
Leslie Hawkins - back-up vocals
Cassie Gaines, Jo Billingsley - back-up vocals (1,9)
Clydie King, Merry Clayton and Friends - background vocals (7)

Certifications

References

Lynyrd Skynyrd compilation albums
1979 compilation albums
MCA Records compilation albums